Miquel Soler Sarasols (born 16 March 1965) is a Spanish retired football player and manager.

Mainly a left back who could also operate as a wide midfielder, his career spanned two La Liga decades (with nearly 700 competitive matches), and he was the only player to represent both Barcelona and Madrid main teams.

Soler appeared for Spain at Euro 1988.

Club career
Born in Girona, Catalonia, Soler was a RCD Espanyol youth graduate, making his first-team – and La Liga – debut in the 1983–84 season and going on to become an essential element after a loan to neighbouring CE L'Hospitalet. In his fourth year, as the club finished third after the second stage, he appeared in 41 out of 42 games and scored two goals, going on to help it reach the final of the 1988 UEFA Cup, netting in the first leg (3–0 home win) as the Pericos eventually lost on penalties against Bayer 04 Leverkusen.

Subsequently, Soler joined neighbours FC Barcelona, helping the side to the UEFA Cup Winners' Cup in his first season while also playing 23 matches in the league. After a sole campaign with Atlético Madrid, where he won his second Copa del Rey, he returned to Barcelona, with no impact.

After two excellent years with Sevilla FC, Soler moved to Real Madrid, but appeared scarcely during 1995–96, his only season. After two years with Real Zaragoza he was still able, at 33, to sign with RCD Mallorca, where he amassed a further 152 top-flight appearances, winning another domestic cup and retiring at the end of 2002–03; he played a total of 504 games at that level, scoring 12 times.

Soler started working as a manager with Mallorca's reserves, going on to be in charge of the team for three years, two in Segunda División B. In the summer of 2014, he was appointed at the helm of the main squad in Segunda División, being relieved of his duties one month later after a directorial change but returning in February 2015 after his successor Valery Karpin was dismissed.

International career
Soler won nine caps for the Spain national team, and represented the nation at UEFA Euro 1988, where he appeared in the win against Denmark (playing the second half) and the loss to Italy. His debut came in a Euro 1988 qualifier in Bucharest, a 3–1 defeat against Romania on 29 April 1987.

Managerial statistics

Honours
Barcelona
La Liga: 1990–91, 1992–93
Copa del Rey: 1989–90
UEFA Cup Winners' Cup: 1988–89; Runner-up 1990–91

Atlético Madrid
Copa del Rey: 1991–92

Mallorca
Copa del Rey: 2002–03
Supercopa de España: 1998
UEFA Cup Winners' Cup: Runner-up 1998–99

See also
 List of La Liga players (400+ appearances)

References

External links

1965 births
Living people
Sportspeople from Girona
Spanish footballers
Footballers from Catalonia
Association football defenders
Association football midfielders
La Liga players
UE Olot players
RCD Espanyol footballers
CE L'Hospitalet players
FC Barcelona players
Atlético Madrid footballers
Sevilla FC players
Real Madrid CF players
Real Zaragoza players
RCD Mallorca players
Spain youth international footballers
Spain under-21 international footballers
Spain under-23 international footballers
Spain international footballers
UEFA Euro 1988 players
Catalonia international footballers
Spanish football managers
Segunda División managers
Segunda División B managers
RCD Mallorca B managers
RCD Mallorca managers